Moses of Bergamo was a twelfth-century Italian poet and translator. He spent time in Constantinople, where he was one of the first Western Europeans to be interested in collecting Greek language manuscripts.

He is known for his Liber Pergamensis, a description of Bergamo in Latin verse. It is the earliest surviving example of a genre: the patriotic description of a medieval commune.

Notes

References
Charles Homer Haskins (1924), Studies in the History of Mediaeval Science, Chapter X

Italian poets
Italian male poets
Italian translators
12th-century Italian poets
People from Bergamo